Janine Sutto,  (20 April 1921 – 28 March 2017) was a French-born Canadian actress and comedian.

Career
Born in Paris to Léopold Sutto and Renée Mamert, she emigrated to Canada in 1930, with her family settling in Montreal.

At age 14, Sutto began acting in radio dramas, and later performed stage roles. In 1943, she was a founding member of the Théâtre de l'Equipe troupe, and she continued acting on stage through the early 1950s with Théâtre du Nouveau Monde. She also made over 75 film and television appearances, with her first film appearance being in the 1945 film The Music Master (Le Père Chopin).

Her biography, titled Vivre avec le destin (Living with Destiny), written by her son-in-law Jean-François Lépine, was published in 2010.

Sutto died in a Montreal palliative care facility in March 2017 at age 95, as reported by Lépine.

Honours
In 1986 she was made an Officer of the Order of Canada and was promoted to Companion in 1991. In 1998, she was made a Knight of the National Order of Quebec. In May 2014, Sutto received a Governor General's Performing Arts Award for Lifetime Artistic Achievement for her contribution to Canadian theatre.

References

External links

 
 Janine Sutto  at The Canadian Encyclopedia

1921 births
2017 deaths
Canadian film actresses
Canadian stage actresses
Canadian television actresses
Companions of the Order of Canada
French emigrants to Quebec
Knights of the National Order of Quebec
Chevaliers of the Ordre des Arts et des Lettres
Actresses from Montreal
Governor General's Performing Arts Award winners
Canadian radio actresses
Actresses from Paris